Corneal ectatic disorders or corneal ectasia are a group of uncommon, noninflammatory, eye disorders characterised by bilateral thinning of the central, paracentral, or peripheral cornea.

Types
Keratoconus, a progressive, noninflammatory, bilateral, asymmetric disease, characterized by paraxial stromal thinning and weakening that leads to corneal surface distortion.
Keratoglobus, a rare noninflammatory corneal thinning disorder, characterised by generalised thinning and globular protrusion of the cornea.
Pellucid marginal degeneration, a bilateral, noninflammatory disorder, characterized by a peripheral band of thinning of the inferior cornea.
Posterior keratoconus, a rare condition, usually congenital, which causes a nonprogressive thinning of the inner surface of the cornea, while the curvature of the anterior surface remains normal. Usually only a single eye is affected.
Post-LASIK ectasia, a complication of LASIK eye surgery.
Terrien's marginal degeneration, a painless, noninflammatory, unilateral or asymmetrically bilateral, slowly progressive thinning of the peripheral corneal stroma.

Diagnosis
Usually diagnosed clinically by several clinical tests. Although some investigations might needed for confirming the diagnosis and to differentiate different types of corneal ectatic diseases.
Corneal topography
Corneal tomography

Treatment
Treatment options include contact lenses and intrastromal corneal ring segments for correcting refractive errors caused by irregular corneal surface, corneal collagen cross-linking to strengthen a weak and ectatic cornea, or corneal transplant for advanced cases.

References

External links 
 International Journal of Keratoconus and Ectatic Corneal Diseases

Disorders of sclera and cornea
Eye diseases